Three Olives Vodka is a brand of vodka produced and distilled in the United Kingdom and imported to the United States by Proximo Spirits.

History
Three Olives Vodka was founded by Guillaume Cuvelier in London in 1998, and acquired by Proximo Spirits in 2007.

Ingredients and creation
Three Olives Vodka is made from quadruple-distilled winter wheat harvested in England. The vodka is handcrafted and is available as a clear unflavored vodka as well as a variety of infused vodkas. The flavored vodkas are made using the circulation method, where the vodka flows into the flavored liquid to create the flavored vodka. The water used is sourced from a lake in Wales that was created by a dam that flooded in 1888, submerging an old village.

Three Olives unflavored vodka is 40% alcohol by volume (80 proof). Nearly all Three Olives flavored vodka types are 35% abv (70 proof).

Varieties

Honors and awards
Three Olives won six consecutive Impact "Hot Brand" awards from 2005 to 2010, from spirits industry magazine Impact. In 2005, Wine Enthusiast magazine gave Three Olives unflavored vodka a Superb (90-95) / Highly Recommended rating, and its Vanilla and Orange flavors a Superb (90-95) / Highly Recommended rating.

Advertising
In 2013, Three Olives launched a $20 million international print, billboard and digital advertising campaign starring actor Clive Owen. The ads feature atmospheric stills of Owen in a variety of London locations, reflecting the vodka's British origin. That same year, Three Olives partnered with the estate of Marilyn Monroe to create a Marilyn Monroe Strawberry Vodka, with a strawberries and cream flavor. The bottle's label featured a classic image of Monroe standing over a subway grate as the wind ruffles her white dress.  The deal was a three-year license that expired in January 2016, hence the Strawberry vodka had dropped the Monroe name during 2015 production.  Proximo previously launched a $10 million animated campaign for the vodka in 2011, and their grape-flavored Purple vodka was endorsed by rapper Lil' Kim in a 2010 national ad campaign.

References

External links
 Official site
 Facebook Page

British vodkas
Alcoholic drink brands